The following lists events that happened during 1996 in Indonesia.

Incumbents
 President: Suharto
 Vice President: Try Sutrisno
 Chief Justice: Suryono (until November 1), Sarwata (starting November 1)

Events

January
 January 8 – Mapenduma hostage crisis: The Free Papua Movement took 26 members of a World Wildlife Fund research mission captive at Mapenduma, Jayawijaya in Irian Jaya (now Papua Province), Indonesia.
 January 19 – An Indonesian ferry sinks off the northern tip of Sumatra, drowning more than 100 people.

February
 February 17 – The 8.2  Biak earthquake strikes the Papua province of eastern Indonesia with a maximum Mercalli intensity of VIII (Severe). A large tsunami followed, leaving 166 people dead or missing and 423 injured.

July
 July 27 – Indonesian government forces attacked the head office of the Indonesian Democratic Party, which was being occupied by supporters of recently ousted party leader Megawati Sukarnoputri.

August
 August 1 – A pro-democracy demonstration supporting Megawati Sukarnoputri in Indonesia is broken up by riot police.
 August 13 – Fuad Muhammad Syafruddin, an Indonesian journalist, was attacked at his house by two unidentified assailants. He died three days later.

Births

February
 February 13 – Muhammad Rian Ardianto, Indonesian badminton player

October
 October 13 – Terens Puhiri, Indonesian footballer
 October 20 – Anthony Sinisuka Ginting, Indonesian badminton player

November
 November 1 – Sean Gelael, Indonesian racing driver

Deaths

April
 April 28 – Siti Hartinah, 2nd First Lady of Indonesia, wife of Suharto (b. 1923)

May
 May 23 – Kronid Lyubarsky, Russian journalist and human rights activist (b. 1934)

August
 August 16 – Fuad Muhammad Syafruddin, Indonesian journalist (b. 1963)

References

Works cited 

 
 

 
Indonesia
Years of the 20th century in Indonesia
1990s in Indonesia
Indonesia